Saint Martin's Catholic Academy (formerly Saint Martin's Catholic High School) is a coeducational 11-16  Roman Catholic secondary school located in Stoke Golding, near to Hinckley, Leicestershire, England. It is part of the Diocese of Nottingham, and is built on the same grounds as the former Dominican nunnery.

History
Saint Martin's was originally established in 1948 by the Dominican Sisters of St. Catherine of Siena based in King William's Town, South Africa as an independent girls' school, Blessed Martin in the Fields at Stoke Lodge, Stoke Golding. This branch of the Dominican order was founded in 1877 by a group of women from Augsburg in Germany. Although now a state funded Catholic academy, the school grounds and buildings are still owned by the Dominicans.

The site of Stoke Lodge convent was adjacent to the current school site. The current school building was constructed in 1963. Due to poor condition of the old Lodge, it was demolished in 1971 and the convent was rebuilt. The convent chapel was dedicated to The Holy Spirit and St Martin. The convent finally closed in 2011 and the land sold for housing.

The current school site retains a significant area of the former grounds of the Lodge; many of the old trees on the site give evidence of its former landscape.

The school itself is named after Saint Martín de Porres, a Dominican saint from Lima in Peru.

In 1963 Saint Martin's became a Voluntary Aided Co-ed Catholic School and in 2014 it converted to an Academy, part of the St Dominic's Multi-Academy Trust. This Trust was incorporated into the St Thomas Aquinas Catholic Multi-Academy Trust in 2018, a federation incorporating all the state-funded Catholic Schools in Leicestershire.

Saint Martin's motto is 'Veritas' (Truth) and their mission statement is 'Learning the best that has been thought and said and knowing that we are loved by God.'

Gallery

References

Secondary schools in Leicestershire
Catholic secondary schools in the Diocese of Nottingham
Educational institutions established in 1948
1948 establishments in England
Academies in Leicestershire